International Terminal railway station is located on the Airport line in Queensland, Australia. It serves the International Terminal at Brisbane Airport, opening on 5 May 2001 at the same time as the line.

The station along with the line is owned and operated by Airtrain Citylink under a BOOT scheme. It will pass to Queensland Rail ownership in 2036.

Services are operated by City network. Although TransLink's go card is able to be used, the station is not included in the TransLink fare structure, with Airtrain able to charge a premium fare.

Connection to the airport terminal
The railway station is directly connected to Level 3 of the Brisbane Airport's international terminal by a covered elevated footbridge.

Services
International Terminal is served by City network Airport line services to Roma Street, Park Road, Varsity Lakes and Domestic Terminal.

Services by platform

References

External links

International station Queensland's Railways on the Internet
[ International station] TransLink travel information

Airport railway stations in Australia
Railway stations in Brisbane
Railway stations in Australia opened in 2001
Brisbane Airport